USNS De Steiguer (T-AGOR-12) was a Robert D. Conrad-class oceanographic research ship acquired by the U.S. Navy in 1966. She was a Navy pool vessel assigned to Naval laboratories until she was transferred to the Tunisian Navy in 1992.

Built in Portland, Oregon
De Steiguer was built by the Northwest Marine Iron Works, Portland, Oregon. She was laid down on 12 November 1965 and launched on 21 March 1966 and turned over to the Navy on 28 February 1969, as USNS De Steiguer (T-AGOR-12).

Oceanographic service
De Steiguer was a U.S. Navy oceanographic research ship assigned to support Naval laboratories. De Steiguer was one of two AGOR ships, the other was Bartlett (T-AGOR 13), assigned as pool vessels for west coast Naval laboratory use according to a 1970 report. Bartlett and De Steiguer were assigned to the U.S. Naval Oceanographic Office for operation.

Inactivation
On 2 November 1992 De Steiguer was approved under the terms of the Security Assistance Program for a transfer to Tunisia, where she now serves the Tunisian Navy as Salammbo (A-701).

Note
There is no information on De Steiguer in the Dictionary of American Naval Fighting Ships.

See also
 United States Navy
 Oceanography

References

 NavSource Online: Service Ship Photo Archive - T-AGOR-12 De Steiguer

 

Robert D. Conrad-class oceanographic research ships
Research vessels of the United States Navy
Ships built in Portland, Oregon
1966 ships
Ships transferred from the United States Navy to the Tunisian Navy